Australia is a major petroleum producer and importer, with a number of petroleum companies involved in upstream and downstream operations. Western Australia is the largest contributor to Australia's production of most petroleum products.

Historical context
Kerosene was used extensively in the mid-nineteenth century and early twentieth century as a fuel for lighting homes and streets. With the advent of the motor car, crude oil came into demand as a fuel. By 1911 petrol surpassed kerosene in sales as the fuel for most vehicles.

Between the 1920s and 1950s, the Shell Company of Australia and Vacuum Oil Company Australia Pty Ltd were selling petrol through single-brand service stations while Golden Fleece, Independent Oil Industry and Commonwealth Oil Refineries Ltd operated through multiple-brand stations. In 1936, Sir William Gaston Walkley founded the Australian Motorists Petrol Company Limited (later Ampol) in response to Australians' concerns about perceived inequitable petrol pricing, and allegations of transfer pricing by foreign oil companies to limit their tax liabilities in Australia.

The first oil discovery in Australia was made near Lakes Entrance, Victoria in 1924. The West Australian Petroleum Pty Ltd (WAPET) joint venture discovered Australia's first flowing oil in November 1953, at Rough Range on the North West Cape. WAPET later discovered in 1964 the first commercial natural gas field in Western Australia, at Dongara in the Perth Basin.

In 1998, the federal government discontinued fuel price regulation in 1998. However, the Victorian and Western Australian state governments passed their own price control legislations in 2000.

Upstream
Upstream activities typically include the exploration and appraisal, development and construction, and production of oil and gas. The sector in Australia is dominated by international companies including Apache, BHP, Chevron, ConocoPhillips, ExxonMobil, Santos, Shell and Woodside. Out of these, Apache, ConocoPhillips, Chevron and ExxonMobil have parent companies in the US, while BP and Shell have parent companies in Europe. Santos and Woodside are based in Australia and are listed on the Australian Securities Exchange (ASX).

Most onshore and offshore production licences are also issued to multiple parties such as joint ventures. For example, the North West Shelf Venture comprises BHP, BP, Chevron, Shell, Woodside Petroleum and a 50:50 joint venture between Mitsubishi and Mitsui & Co, with each holding an equal one-sixth shareholding.

According to a 2009 report by the Australian Government's Productivity Commission, joint ventures are important in the petroleum industry, as they "facilitate risk sharing, and allow businesses to specialise and still accomplish the maximum development of a given field." Joint ventures also allow "smaller businesses to be involved in production without raising the large quantities of capital required to develop a field alone."

Reserves
Over 80 per cent of Australia’s gas reserves and over 95 per cent of oil reserves are offshore, with reserves concentrated in the Bonaparte, Browse, Carnarvon and Gippsland basins.

Downstream
After upstream activities, petroleum products are sold to downstream customers, such as oil refineries, gas retailers, and overseas markets.

Refineries
Treated crude oil cannot be used as fuel but must be refined.

Until the 2000s, there were seven oil refineries:

There was also an eighth refinery, the Port Stanvac Refinery, which was mothballed by ExxonMobil Australia in 2003 and permanently closed in 2009. The main reason for the closure was that it was "one of the smallest refineries in the Asia–Pacific region", and "could not compete against larger regional refineries".

By December 2020, three of the above seven refineries had already closed, with the Altona (ExxonMobil), Geelong (Viva), Kwinana (BP) and Lytton (Ampol) refineries remaining operational. The Kurnell Refinery was closed in 2014 and was converted into a fuel import terminal.

The Kwinana refinery closed in 2021, while the Altona refinery is in the final stages of closing down , with both refineries also being converted to fuel import terminals. This meant that from 2023, only the Geelong and Lytton refineries remain.

Marketing and distribution
The retail downstream business is dominated by Ampol, which has 1,900 stores across the country . This also includes 540 stations which are co-branded and operated by EG Australia.

References